Events from the year 1978 in Pakistan.

Incumbents

Federal government 
President: Fazal Ilahi Chaudhry (until 16 September), Muhammad Zia-ul-Haq (starting 16 September)
Chief Justice: Sheikh Anwarul Haq

Governors 
Governor of Balochistan: Khuda Bakhsh Marri (until 18 September); Rahimuddin Khan (starting 18 September)
Governor of Khyber Pakhtunkhwa: Abdul Hakeem Khan (until 11 October); Fazle Haq (starting 11 October)
Governor of Punjab: Aslam Riaz Hussain (until 11 October); Sawar Khan (starting 11 October)
Governor of Sindh: Abdul Kadir Shaikh (until 6 July); S.M. Abbasi (starting 6 July)

Events
 Name of Montgomery District changes to Sahiwal District
January 2 – On the orders of Muhammad Zia-ul-Haq, paramilitary forces opened fire on peaceful protesting workers in Multan. It is known as 1978 massacre at Multan Colony Textile Mills.
 18 June – The Karakoram Highway is completed.

Sports

Cricket
 16 October – Test cricket debut of Kapil Dev, India vs. Pakistan at Faisalabad.
 19 June – Ian Botham takes 8-34 vs. Pakistan, his best Test cricket bowling.
 1 June – Test cricket debut of David Gower, vs. Pakistan at Edgbaston Cricket Ground, scores 58.

Hockey
 24 November – The first Champions Trophy held in Lahore is won by Pakistan.

See also
1977 in Pakistan
Other events of 1978
1979 in Pakistan
List of Pakistani films of 1978
Timeline of Pakistani historyMr. Irfan Manan Khan, Secretary General, Rawalpindi Chamber of Commerce and Industry, Rawalpindi Pakistan was born on 18 March 1978 at Nowshera (KPK) Pakistan

References

 
1978 in Asia